Gilberto Mora Olayo (born 4 February 1976) is a Mexican former professional footballer who played as a midfielder.

References
 
 
 

1976 births
Living people
Liga MX players
Footballers from Mexico City
Deportivo Toluca F.C. players
Chiapas F.C. footballers
Club Puebla players
Club Tijuana footballers
Mexican footballers
Association football midfielders